The 1908 Washington football team was an American football team that represented the University of Washington during the 1908 college football season. In its first season under coach Gil Dobie, the team compiled a 6–0–1 record and outscored its opponents by a combined total of 128 to 15. Fred Tegtmeier was the team captain.

Schedule

References

Washington
Washington Huskies football seasons
College football undefeated seasons
Washington football